Peter Taylor (born 3 January 1984) is a New Zealand rower.

Taylor was born in 1984 in Lower Hutt; he lives in Days Bay. In 2006 along with Graham Oberlin-Brown he became the Under 23 World Champion in the men's lightweight double sculls, and in doing so set a new world under 23 best time.

Partnering Storm Uru he finished 7th in the men's lightweight double sculls at the 2008 Summer Olympics. The pair bettered this result at the 2012 Summer Olympics, winning the bronze medal in the same event.

In February 2011, Taylor caused an upset win when he became New Zealand national champion in the lightweight men's single sculls at Lake Ruataniwha, beating triple world champion Duncan Grant.

At the 2013 World Rowing Championships held at Tangeum Lake, Chungju in South Korea, he won a silver medal in the lightweight men's four with James Hunter, Curtis Rapley, and James Lassche. At the 2014 World Rowing Championships held at Bosbaan, Amsterdam, he won a silver medal in the lightweight men's four with James Hunter, Alistair Bond, and Curtis Rapley.

Taylor retired from rowing after competing at the 2016 Summer Olympics.

References

External links

 

1984 births
Living people
Sportspeople from Lower Hutt
Olympic rowers of New Zealand
Olympic bronze medalists for New Zealand
Rowers at the 2008 Summer Olympics
Rowers at the 2012 Summer Olympics
Olympic medalists in rowing
Medalists at the 2012 Summer Olympics
World Rowing Championships medalists for New Zealand
New Zealand male rowers
Rowers at the 2016 Summer Olympics